Christophe Eagleton (born February 16, 1982) is an American composer, sound designer and Immersive Entertainment Director. He is the founder of media company Dynamite Laser Beam who has worked with companies such as Disney, T-Mobile, MTV, Coca-Cola, Universal Pictures, and Electronic Arts.

Life and career

Born in London, England and now hailing from Los Angeles, CA, Eagleton has been an innovator in sound design since 2003. He founded his company Dynamite Laser Beam which specializes in custom scoring, music production, music library search, audio branding, sound design and more. In 2015 Dynamite Laser Beam was commissioned to create all of the music for the Pepsi Art Dome at Voodoo Fest. Eagleton also created all of the music and sound design for the Electronic Arts Play Experience at E3 in 2016 and 2017.

Discography

 Astra Moveo - [Self Titled] (2009)

References

External links
 Official Website
 

21st-century American composers
Artists from London
Artists from Denver
Artists from Los Angeles
1982 births
Living people